The Chin Hills Congress was a political party in Burma.

History
The party was established in 1951 by Za Hre Lian. It contested the 1951–52 general elections as an ally of the Anti-Fascist People's Freedom League (AFPFL) and merged into the AFPFL in 1954.

References

Defunct political parties in Myanmar
Political parties established in 1951
Political parties disestablished in 1954
1951 establishments in Burma
1954 disestablishments in Burma